The Grip Lighthouse is located in the Grip archipelago in the municipality of Kristiansund in Møre og Romsdal county, Norway.

Description
This is the second tallest lighthouse tower in Norway.

The islet is barren rock with just the lighthouse tower, a concrete boathouse, and two wharves. The lighthouse keepers lived inside the lighthouse tower. A radio beacon was operated between 1947 and 1986, which was replaced with a frequency-agile racon signalling "G" with a range of 4 nm. The lighthouse was electrified in 1932, and is unmanned since it was automated in 1977. In 2000, it became protected as a cultural heritage site.  The pilot station was shut down in 1969.

See also

Lighthouses in Norway
List of lighthouses in Norway

References

External links
 Norsk Fyrhistorisk Forening 

Lighthouses completed in 1888
Buildings and structures in Kristiansund
Lighthouses in Møre og Romsdal